The 2015 Connecticut Huskies men's soccer team represented the University of Connecticut during the 2015 NCAA Division I men's soccer season.  The Huskies were coached by Ray Reid, in his nineteenth season.  They played home games at Morrone Stadium.

Schedule

|-
!colspan=6 style="background:#002868; color:#FFFFFF;"| Exhibition

|-
!colspan=6 style="background:#002868; color:#FFFFFF;"| Regular season

|-
!colspan=6 style="background:#002868; color:#FFFFFF;"| AAC Tournament

|-
!colspan=6 style="background:#002868; color:#FFFFFF;"| NCAA Tournament

References

UConn Huskies men's soccer seasons
Connecticut
UConn Soccer, men's
Connecticut